Griffith is a major regional city in the Murrumbidgee Irrigation Area that is located in the north-western part of the Riverina region of New South Wales, known commonly as the food bowl of Australia.  It is also the seat of the City of Griffith local government area.  Like the Australian capital, Canberra, and extensions to the nearby town of Leeton, Griffith was designed by Walter Burley Griffin and Marion Mahony Griffin. Griffith was named after Arthur Hill Griffith, the then New South Wales Secretary for Public Works. Griffith was proclaimed a city in 1987, and had a population of 20,251 in June 2018.

It can be accessed by road from Sydney and Canberra via the Hume Highway and the Burley Griffin Way and from Melbourne, via the Newell Highway and either by using the Kidman Way or the Irrigation Way. Griffith can be accessed from other places like Adelaide, Orange, and Bathurst through the Mid-Western Highway and the Rankins Springs road from Rankins Springs and the Kidman Way from Goolgowi.

History
Griffith and other towns were created as part of the New South Wales State Government's Murrumbidgee Irrigation Area (MIA) project, a plan to supply irrigation from the Murrumbidgee river to open up western New South Wales for farming.

The town plan for Griffith, and nearby Leeton, was designed by Walter Burley Griffin in 1914, an unusual geometric pattern centred on a set of circular streets, with broad avenues radiating out in an octagonal arrangement. The streets were surveyed mostly according to that plan, and Griffith was declared a town in August 1916. 

The main dam of the scheme was the large Burrinjuck Dam on the Murrumbidgee between Gundagai and Canberra, but was not completed until 1928. The Berembed Weir, near Narrandera, was built in 1912, diverting water from the Murrumbidgee River into the Bundidgerry Creek then into the Main Canal of the MIA at Narrandera. The Canal, almost a river in its own right, flows through the MIA, supplying water to the entire area, then flows through Griffith as part of the geometric plan, and peters out to the northwest of the town in rice farms.

The water supply was further enhanced with the construction of the Snowy River scheme by the Australian Federal Government in the 1950s and 1960s. The Blowering Dam, a large dam near Tumut stores a significant amount of water to be released down the Murrumbidgee for irrigation around Leeton, Griffith and the newer Coleambally area south of the Murrumbidgee and Griffith.

From the start of the MIA, citrus and other fruit and vegetables were grown in abundance around Griffith.  In the 1950s the irrigation area expanded to include large rice farms.  Vineyards were established early, and wineries followed, beginning with McWilliam's Wines at Hanwood and Yenda, two villages just outside the city.

From its earliest days, the MIA was populated by Italian workers, some of whom were initially employed by Australian farmers to run steamboats on the Murrumbidgee and Murray Rivers. Approximately 60% of today's Griffith population claim Italian background. These include the initial settlement of Italians from the boat crews and other Italians who came out to Australia in the Depression, or from a second wave of immigrant Italians who came to Griffith in the late 1950s and early 1960s.

In the 1970s, Griffith was often associated with drug distribution (particularly marijuana) and organised crime, as depicted in 2009 by Underbelly: A Tale of Two Cities. However, Griffith is now associated with good wine and food, primarily as a result of its diverse population, with notable contributions by Italian-Australians. Griffith's multi-ethnic population is now absorbing new national groups, including a significant Sikh Indian community. The city is sister city with the Italian city of Treviso in the Veneto Region. Many Italians in Griffith are from the Veneto Region or the Calabria Region of Italy.The Italian influence expanded the range of fruit and vegetables, and also significantly increased the number of wineries and the range of wines produced by the existing wineries in the region, such as McWilliam's. De Bortoli, Rosetto and other wineries were established by Italian immigrants, and today they are well known around Australia. In recent times they have been joined by one of the country's best known wine labels, Yellow Tail, produced by Casella Family Brands. Casella, DeBortoli, McWilliam's, Warburn and Berton Vineyards are now among the top 20 wine producers in Australia.

Griffith is the cathedral city of the Anglican Diocese of Riverina. The foundation stone of the Parish Church of St Alban the Martyr was dedicated in 1954. It was proclaimed as a cathedral in 1984.

Heritage listings 
Griffith has a number of heritage-listed sites, including:
 Scenic Drive: Hermit's Cave

Climate

Griffith has a semi-arid climate (BSk) under the Köppen climate classification with hot summers and cool winters, and rather uniform rainfall spread through the months. During a heatwave on 10 February 2017, temperatures reached , a new record high for February. On 16 January 2019, during a long heatwave, Griffith Airport recorded , the highest maximum temperature for any month on record. The city features 123.8 clear days annually.

Commerce
Griffith is the regional service centre for the vast Murrumbidgee Irrigation Area, one of the most productive agricultural regions in Australia. Thanks to irrigation, Griffith is rich in agriculture and the city is also known as Australia's "Wine and Food Country".

Commercial

Griffith has experienced strong commercial growth in recent years. Griffith's main streets are Banna Avenue and Yambil Streets but commercial growth has occurred throughout the city. Shopping centre developments include:
 Griffith City Plaza
 Griffin Plaza
 Griffith Central
 Griffith Lifestyle Centre
 The Gateway Centre
 Griffith Woolworths Complex
 Griffith City Central
 Driver Shopping Complex

Industrial

Griffith is home to the Riverina's largest employer, poultry processor, the Baiada Group. Griffith also has several wineries, including De Bortoli Wines and Casella Family Brands (makers of Yellow Tail wine).

Residential
In addition to Griffith, the area includes the towns and villages of Willbriggie, Hanwood, Beelbangera, Bilbul, Yoogali, Widgelli, Yenda, Lake Wyangan, Tharbogang and Warburn. The city contains the main suburbs of Collina, Driver, North Griffith, East Griffith, West Griffith, South Griffith, Murrumbidgee, Mayfair, Pioneer Mooreville and Wickhams Hill. The newest development of the suburb Collina has been constructed to the north east of the city's centre.

Demography

In the 2016 Census, there were 19,144 people in Griffith.
 Aboriginal and Torres Strait Islander people made up 5.0% of the population.
 The most common ancestries were Australian 22.4%, English 20.1%, Italian 17.6%, Irish 6.3% and Scottish 5.0%
 68.3% of people were born in Australia. The next most common countries of birth were India 4.7%, Italy 4.4%, New Zealand 1.8%, Philippines 1.0% and England 0.9%.
 67.3% of people spoke only English at home. Other languages spoken at home included Italian 7.5%, Punjabi 3.6%, Gujarati 1.2%, Samoan 1.1% and Mandarin 1.1%. 
 The most common responses for religion were Catholic 37.4%, No Religion 14.2% and Anglican 12.6%.

Education

Griffith is the third largest centre for education in the Riverina after Wagga Wagga and Leeton. 
Griffith is home to three high schools:

 Murrumbidgee Regional High School – MRHS is a super school, made up of two sites, formerly known as Wade High School and Griffith High School
Marian Catholic College (formerly Catholic High School)
 Verity Christian College - established in 2021

Griffith also has 13 primary schools and various day care and pre-school facilities. Griffith has one of the largest campuses of Riverina Institute of TAFE.

Transport
Griffith is a major junction for the Kidman Way, Burley Griffin Way and Irrigation Way. Griffith has daily bus services to the major metropolitan areas.

Griffith Airport has daily flights to Sydney (operated by Regional Express) and, from 15 July 2019, to Melbourne (operated by Sharp Airlines). There are also regular flights to Broken Hill and Narrandera.

Griffith Buslines operates buses through Griffith and surrounding towns and villages, with seven main services and routes. 

The railway reached Griffith on 3 July 1916 and since that date has provided a service transporting passengers and goods to and from the area. Regular goods trains continue, making it a unique railway centre.

Griffith railway station is served by a twice weekly NSW TrainLink Xplorer service from Sydney. NSW TrainLink also operates a daily road coach service from Mildura to Wagga Wagga stopping at Griffith. This service connects at Wagga Wagga with NSW Trainlink rail services to Sydney and Melbourne.

V/Line operates a daily rail/road coach service between Melbourne and Griffith, changing with the train at Shepparton. Melbourne (Southern Cross Station) to Griffith (Bus Terminal at Visitors Centre) is an evening service (daily), and Griffith to Melbourne service is overnight on Monday to Saturday and afternoon on Sunday. Travel time is approximately six and a half to seven hours.

In February 2010, the city's first set of traffic lights was installed at the intersection of Burrell Place and Wakaden Street to reduce traffic congestion in the Griffith CBD.

Events
 Riverina Field Days, which is held annually in May.
 La Festa, Wine, Food and Multicultural Festival, which is held annually over the Easter weekend.
 Festival of Gardens, which is held annually in October
 Sikh Games, held annually on the June Long Weekend
 unWINEd, held annually on the June Long Weekend
 Multicultural Festival of Griffith – each year in October
 Festa delle Salsicce (Festival of the Sausage) – each year in August

Media

Radio 
Griffith is serviced by a number of commercial, community, narrowcast SBS, and ABC stations

Local radio stations broadcasting from Griffith include ABC Riverina, AM radio commercial station Triple M Riverina MIA, FM radio commercial station Hit FM, both owned by Southern Cross Austereo and a rebroadcast from sports station Sky Sports Radio. Other local stations include Christian radio station Vision Radio Network and the community station 2MIAFM95.1. The ABC's national stations Radio National, ABC Classic FM, ABC NewsRadio and Triple J and the multicultural network SBS Radio are broadcast into Griffith.

ABC Riverina, is the local ABC station in Griffith, servicing the entire MIA region. It broadcasts a local breakfast show and a local morning show each weekday broadcast from the ABC studios in Wagga Wagga. Wednesday and Saturday's local morning show is also broadcast to each station on the ABC Local Radio network enabling listeners from outside of the local listening area to call into the popular gardening talk back program. ABC Riverina also has a local news service, produced by local journalists. As well as rural reports, The station also airs a local Saturday breakfast show, which is followed by a local Saturday morning sports program. Apart from local programming, ABC Riverina takes national programs like AM, Conversations, The World Today, PM, Nightlife, Overnights, ABC Grandstand, Saturday Night Country and Australia All Over along with a mid-afternoon program, an evening show and a weekend morning program, all broadcast from ABC Radio Sydney, along with a drive program, broadcast from regional NSW. Other national ABC services that are available in Griffith on separate FM frequencies include Triple J, Radio National, ABC Classic FM and ABC News on Radio.

Triple M Riverina MIA 963 is the Griffith-based commercial FM station owned by Southern Cross Austereo broadcasting from Griffith studios during the day, and then taking networked programming sourced from 2GB, Triple M Gold Coast, Authentic Entertainment Sydney and Triple M. 2RG in Griffith also produces a local news service with a journalist based at the station, compiling and recording local news bulletins for 2RG and sister station 99.7 Star FM.

Hit FM, also owned by Southern Cross Austereo, is a commercial FM station servicing Griffith on a local FM frequency, although its local breakfast show is broadcast from a studio in Griffith. Hit FM is skewed towards the younger listeners with a Top 40/pop music format. Following the local breakfast show, the station takes Hit Music Network programming sourced from Southern Cross Austereo's hub at Sea FM on the Gold Coast or from metropoliton stations such as 2Day FM and Fox FM.

2MIA is the local community station, broadcasting local programs, presented by radio announcers. The station is skewed towards the older demographic and plays a lot of music. All programs are locally produced apart from the regular programming the station takes from the national community radio network.

Television 
Griffith is served by five television stations, three commercial television stations which are all owned by WIN Television's owner WIN Corporation. They are AMN, MTN and MDN, which are regional affiliates of the three Australian commercial television networks (Ten Network, Nine Network and Seven Network) as well as public broadcasters the ABC and SBS.

Until the 1990s, Griffith received only the ABC and MTN, an independent television station showing programmes from all three commercial networks.

The town receives the commercial networks' digital channels which are (7Two, 7mate, 9Go!, 9Gem, 9Life, 10 Bold and 10 Peach all from WIN Television), as well as TVSN, Gold, Sky News Regional, ABC TV Plus (formerly ABC Comedy and ABC2)/ABC Kids, ABC Me (formerly ABC3), ABC News (formerly ABC News 24), SBS Viceland (formerly SBS 2), SBS Food (formerly Food Network) and NITV. Foxtel provides subscription satellite television services.

MTN carries programming from Seven Network, AMN carries programming from Nine Network and MDN carries programming from Ten Network, WIN also broadcasts the Riverina and MIA WIN News bulletin each weeknight.

Regional news coverage of the Griffith and MIA area is provided on all three commercial networks with WIN Griffith airing 90-second local news updates during the day. WIN News are produced from newsrooms in the city but presented from studios in Wollongong.

Newspapers 
The Area News is a daily newspaper published in the city each Monday, Wednesday, and Friday, as well as national newspapers such as The Australian, The Daily Telegraph, Herald Sun, The Weekly Times and The Age.

Sports
The most popular sport in Griffith is Rugby League. Griffith is home to two clubs in the Group 20 Rugby League competition, the Griffith Black & White Panthers, and the Griffith Waratahs Tigers. The two clubs are among the most successful in the league with 6 and 13 titles respectively, with a cross-town derby in the 2017 Grand Final attracting a crowd of over 2,000 people to EW Moore Oval. A third club, the Yenda Blueheelers, based in the small town of Yenda, 15 kilometres from the city centre in the Griffith City Council area, also compete in this competition and have won 7 titles and a Clayton Cup as the best team in the state in 2009. The city has also produced many National Rugby League players, with some going on to represent their state and country.

The Griffith and District Football Association (Soccer) comprises six participating clubs in the Griffith area - Griffith City FC (juniors only), Hanwood FC, West Griffith SC, Yenda Tigers SC (juniors only), Yoogali FC and Yoogali SC - as well as a seventh team, the Deniliquin Wanderers. Yoogali SC also fields a team in the NPL Capital Football competition while Hanwood FC fields a team in the Wagga competition.

Griffith is also home to the Griffith Swans who compete in the Riverina Football League. They have won one title, in 2003, and have been runners-up many times. They previously played in the South West League.

Griffith also has a rugby union team, the Griffith Blacks who play in the Southern Inland Rugby Union.

The city also has strong local cricket and basketball competitions.

Attractions

Griffith has many tourist attractions. These include Pioneer Park, a 510-seat Regional Theatre, the Italian museum, the Griffith Regional Art Gallery, craft and antique shops, and its many high standard restaurants. Many of the Griffith wineries also have wine tasting at the cellar door, notably De Bortoli Wines, Beelgara Estate (formally Rossetto Wines), West End Wines, Berton Vineyards and Warburn Estate. Griffith is famous for its botrytis including Debortoli's Noble One and its fortified wine such as McWilliam's Hanwood Port. Ecotourism is also available in Griffith. Scenic Hill has various walking trails, lookouts and is home to the famous Hermit's Cave. Campbells and Nericon Swamps, part of the Griffith Wetlands Important Bird Area, are important sites for migratory birds. Nearby Cocoparra National Park offers walking trails and there are opportunities to explore along the Murrumbidgee River and Lake Wyangan.

Twin towns and sister cities
Griffith is twinned with:
 Harbin, China
 Comunita Montana del Grappa, Italy
 Fairfield, New South Wales, Australia

Notable people
 Simon Bonetti, Australian rugby league footballer who played in the 1990s and 2000s, winning a premiership in 2002
 Ray Brown, Australian rugby league footballer who played in the 1980s
 Joseph Colpitts, Sgt, Australian Infantry. Fought in nine countries during WWII. Helped rescue many allied soldiers from occupied Crete whilst fighting with the Greek Resistance.  Manager of Griffith Baths. Colpitts Place in Griffith is named in his honour.
 Andrew Fifita, Australian rugby league footballer who scored the match winning try in the 2016 NRL Grand Final
 Geoff Foster, Australian rugby league footballer of the 1970s and 1980s
 Evonne Goolagong, World No. 1 Australian female tennis player
 Stan Grant, TV and radio presenter, journalist, writer and lecturer
 Fred Griffiths, Rhodesian-born South African international rugby league player of the 1950s and 1960s, captain-coached Griffith Black & Whites
 Michael Henderson, Australian rugby league footballer who played in the 2000s and 2010s
 Gary Higgins, former opposition leader of the Northern Territory  Parliament from 2016-2020
 Greg Keenan, Australian rugby league footballer who played in the 1990s
 Mark Larkham, racing driver
 Trevor Long, Technology Commentator and Today Show Tech Expert was born in Griffith, attended Griffith High School year 7-10.
 Donald Mackay, anti-drugs campaigner
 David Milne, Australian rugby league footballer who played in the 2000s and 2010s
 Laurie Moraschi, Australian rugby league footballer of the 1960s and 1970s
 Phillip Noyce, director of the 2002 film Rabbit-Proof Fence and the 2010 American film Salt
 Luke O'Dwyer, Australian rugby league footballer of the 2000s and 2010s
 John O'Neill, Australian rugby league footballer of the 1960s and 1970s
 Esava Ratugolea, Current AFL player for Geelong
 Valerio Ricetti, cave-dwelling hermit
 Robbie Simpson, Australian rugby league footballer who played in the 1990s and 2000s
 Shaun Spence, Australian rugby league footballer of the 2010s
 Robert Trimbole, Australian drug baron, organized crime boss and businessman
 Gary Warburton, Australian rugby league footballer of the 2000s and 2010s, born in Griffith
 Jason Wells, Australian rugby league footballer of the 2000s

Notes and references

External links

 
Populated places established in 1916
Towns in the Riverina
Planned cities in Australia
Cities planned by Walter Burley Griffin